Fritz Pollard Jr. (February 18, 1915 – February 15, 2003) was an American athlete who competed mainly in the 110 metre hurdles.

Biography
While a student at the University of North Dakota, he was a running back for the football team. He was "picked All North Central Conference in 1937 and 1938, and was a Collier's Magazine Little All-America selection in football in 1938." He also competed as 
a member of the university's varsity boxing team. Pollard competed for the United States in the 1936 Summer Olympics in Berlin in the 110 meter hurdles where he won the bronze medal. In 2016, the 1936 Olympic journey of the eighteen Black American athletes, including Pollard, was documented in the film Olympic Pride, American Prejudice.

Pollard graduated from UND with a bachelor's degree majoring in education. He went on to earn a law degree from the John Marshall Law School (Chicago). He also served in the U.S. Army as a special services officer during World War II."  Some years after he war, he became a Foreign Service officer and retired in 1981 as the director of the State Department's overseas schools for US citizens.

Pollard was a member of Alpha Phi Alpha fraternity.

Pollard's father was Fritz Pollard Sr., the first African American head coach in the National Football League.

He is survived by one of his two children, Fritz D. Pollard III  (Cheryl Pollard- deceased) and two grandchildren Meredith Kaye Russell and Marcus Stephan Pollard.

References

Greek bibliography: Andreou,Evangelos: "The star of champion shone..." Ed. EUARCE 2011 ("Frederick "Fritz" Pollard" p.30) Ευάγγελος Ανδρέου, Το αστέρι του πρωταθλητή άναψε... / ο βαλκανιονίκης του μεσοπολέμου Γιάννης Σκιαδάς, EUARCE 2011  ("Φρεντερίκ Πολάρντ/Frederick "Fritz" Pollard" σ.30)

External links
History of the Olympic Trials
NY Times

 University of North Dakota

1915 births
2003 deaths
American male hurdlers
African-American male track and field athletes
Athletes (track and field) at the 1936 Summer Olympics
North Dakota Fighting Hawks football players
Olympic bronze medalists for the United States in track and field
University of North Dakota alumni
Sportspeople from Springfield, Massachusetts
Medalists at the 1936 Summer Olympics
20th-century African-American sportspeople
21st-century African-American people